Pablo Andrés Ibáñez (born 28 October 1998) is a Salvadorian athlete specialising in the 400 metres hurdles. He represented his country at the 2017 World Championships in London without advancing from the heats.

International competitions

Personal bests
Outdoor
400 metres – 48.20 (San Salvador 2018)
400 metres hurdles – 49.96 (Barranquilla 2018) NR

References

1998 births
Living people
Salvadoran hurdlers
World Athletics Championships athletes for El Salvador
Athletes (track and field) at the 2019 Pan American Games
Pan American Games competitors for El Salvador
Competitors at the 2018 Central American and Caribbean Games
21st-century Salvadoran people